Moisés Fajardo (born 5 July 1947) is a Spanish boxer. He competed in the men's light middleweight event at the 1968 Summer Olympics.

References

1947 births
Living people
Spanish male boxers
Olympic boxers of Spain
Boxers at the 1968 Summer Olympics
People from La Palma
Sportspeople from the Province of Santa Cruz de Tenerife
Light-middleweight boxers